Amédée Raymond Melanson (November 9, 1882 – May 8, 1930) was a Canadian physician and political figure in Nova Scotia. He represented Yarmouth County in the Nova Scotia House of Assembly from 1920 to 1925 as a Liberal member.

Early life and education
He was born in Corberrie, Digby County, Nova Scotia, the son of Raymond Melanson and Marie LeBlanc. Melanson was educated at St. Anne's College and Dalhousie University.

Career
He set up practice in Sainte-Anne-du-Ruisseau.

Death
He died in Eel Brook, Yarmouth County, Nova Scotia at the age of 47.

Personal life
In 1910, he married Marie Julie Hamelin.

References 
 A Directory of the Members of the Legislative Assembly of Nova Scotia, 1758-1958, Public Archives of Nova Scotia (1958)

1882 births
1930 deaths
Nova Scotia Liberal Party MLAs
Acadian people
People from Digby County, Nova Scotia